Chelsea Newton (born February 17, 1983) is an American women's college basketball coach, currently the associate head coach at Texas A&M. Newton served as an assistant coach at Rutgers University from 2010 to 2015 and at Georgia from 2015 to 2022.  

In 2006–07, Newton served as Director of Player Development for Rutgers’ National Runner-Up team.  As a player, drafted in 2005 by the WNBA's Sacramento Monarchs in the 2nd round overall pick 22.  A member of the 2005 World Champions Sacramento Monarchs.  Also a member of the 2005 All-Rookie Team.   In 2007, Newton was chosen to the WNBA's 2nd Team All- Defense.  After Sacramento folded, she signed with the Seattle Storm, but later retired before even playing a game with them.

Newton also played internationally in Israel, Poland, and Italy.

Born in Monroe, Louisiana, Newton played for Carroll  High School in Monroe, Louisiana.  Received numerous basketball accolades but most importantly was a high academic achieved.  She was the Valedictorian of her high school class.   Newton was named a WBCA All-American. She participated in the 2001 WBCA High School All-America Game where she scored fourteen points.

Rutgers statistics
Source

Notes 

WNBA.com: Chelsea Newton Playerfile

1983 births
Living people
American women's basketball players
Basketball coaches from Louisiana
Basketball players from Louisiana
Chicago Sky players
Georgia Lady Bulldogs basketball coaches
Rutgers Scarlet Knights women's basketball players
Sacramento Monarchs players
Sportspeople from Monroe, Louisiana
Shooting guards